Robert Gardner may refer to:

Law and politics
Bob Gardner, legislator in Colorado
Robert Gardner (Victorian politician) (1916–2002), Australian politician
Robert A. Gardner (politician), Ohio politician
Robert K. A. Gardiner (1914–1994), Ghanaian minister for Finance and Economic Planning
Bob Gardner (Queensland politician) (1890–1966), member of the Queensland Legislative Assembly

Sportspeople
Robert Gardner (footballer) (1847–1887), Scottish footballer
Robert Gardner (golfer) (1890–1956), American golfer and pole vaulter
Rob Gardner (baseball) (born 1944), Major League Baseball pitcher

Musicians
Rob Gardner (musician) (born 1965), rock musician
Rob Gardner (composer) (born 1978), American composer of primarily oratorios

Others
Robert Gardner (academic) (born 1938), Canadian documentary filmmaker and Ryerson University professor
Robert Gardner (anthropologist) (1925–2014), director of the Film Study Center, Harvard University
Robert Gardner (ballet), artistic director of the Minnesota Ballet
Robert Brown Gardner (1939–1998), American mathematician
Robert H. Gardner (born 1947), American documentary filmmaker
Robert W. Gardner (inventor), invented the speed governor used in steam engines; see also Robert W. Gardner House
R. Wayne Gardner (1894–?), minister, academic, and the president of the Eastern Nazarene College
Robert J. Gardner (1837–1902), American soldier in the American Civil War
Robert Waterman Gardner (1866–1937), architect

See also
Gardner (surname)